Mark Jones is an English musician and the founder of Wall of Sound record label.

Early life
He was born in Hayes, Middlesex.  Jones went to art college and left after one day to form a visuals company called Pop with Michael Speechley.  He went on to work with Nicky Holloway, putting on the Special Branch parties at The Royal Oak, The Zoo, Rockley Sands, Mambo Madness and many other acid house parties such as Trip, Sin and Shoom.

Career
He formed the prock (pop/rock) band Perfect Day, who performed on Trevor and Simon on BBC Television, and appeared on the front cover of Just Seventeen and Jackie magazines.

After A Perfect Day disbanded, he joined with Marc Lessner, and started working at Soul Trader record distributors one day a week, which soon turned into a full-time occupation.  There he started pressing and distributing deals for small labels and acts such as Kruder and Dorfmeister, Basement Jaxx and Larry Heard among others.  A compilation of these artists was made and entitled Give 'Em Enough Dope Vol.1, and in 1994 Wall of Sound was officially launched.

References

External links
wallofsound.net
A Perfect Day

Living people
Year of birth missing (living people)
British pop musicians